Feasibility may refer to:

Logical possibility, that which is achievable
Feasible region, a region that satisfies mathematical constraints
Feasibility study, a preliminary study to determine a project's viability
"Feasibility Study" (The Outer Limits), an episode of The Outer Limits TV show

See also
Practicality